Hinduism was first introduced by Sindhi settlers who migrated to Ghana after India was divided in 1947. It was spread to Ghana actively by Ghana's Hindu Monastery headed by Swami Ghananand Saraswati and by the International Society for Krishna Consciousness (ISKCON). Hinduism is the fastest growing religion in Ghana.

Population
In 2009, there were 12,500 (0.05%) Hindus in Ghana. Most of the Hindus are indigenous Africans. Ghana is one of the three countries  outside Asia where Hindus are native (others being Russia and Ukraine), not immigrants. Swami Ghananand Saraswati has set up five temples in Ghana which have been the cornerstone of the African Hindu Monastery (AHM). The Indian community in Ghana participates in the AHM, but also has its own temples (most for the Sindhi community). ISKCON also has a fairly large presence in the nation, as do śishya (disciples) of Sathya Sai Baba. Hinduism is thought to be the fastest growing religion in Ghana.

Beliefs and practices of Ghanaian Hindus

Aside from the basic beliefs of reincarnation and Karma that are attributed to a vast majority of Hindus, Ghanaian followers of Hindu tradition have a few specific beliefs and practices that are primarily emphasized. First and foremost, the primary indication that a person in Ghana is a believer of the Hindu faith is that he or she has made the decision to not include meat in their diet. This is considered a primary indicator because other Hindu practices such as prohibition from illicit sex and abstinence from alcohol are also commonly demanded by other Ghanaian religions, while the avoidance of meat is rather unusual. Ghanaian Hindus tend to avoid meat consumption due to the belief that every life is sacred and manifestation of supreme God. Eating consciously when other sources of food are available in order not to harm anyone. Stemming from this idea, the second defining belief of Hindus in Ghana is the notion that cows are sacred beings that must not be harmed, but rather revered. This belief comes from the understanding that when the Hindu deity Krishna was incarnated on Earth, he came as a cowherd. Also, the Vedic Hindu Goddess Aditi is portrayed as a cow whose milk is identified with the invigorating drink "soma" which is believed to nourish creation. This Ghanaian Hindu belief is also a defining one, as not only do a majority of Ghanaians eat cow's meat daily, but the remaining resources from the cow's body are also commonly used for other practical tasks in traditional Ghanaian lifestyles.

Hindu denominations

Hindus in Ghana are followers of two major Hindu denominations- Shaivism by the Hindu Monastery of Africa and Vaishnavism by the Hare Krishnas(ISKCON).

The Hare Krishnas are the local branch of the well-known worldwide  Hindu religious movement founded in 1966 by A. C. Bhaktivedanta Swami Prabhupada. The center for their activities in Ghana is the Sri Radha Govinda Temple in the town of Medie outside Accra, but there are numerous small groups of devotees around the country as reflected in the community’s multi-ethnic composition. In contrast, Akans make up most of the membership of the Hindu Monastery, an indigenous temple located in the Odorkor neighborhood of Accra. This temple was built in 1975 by the Swami Ghanananda

Other Hindu groups include Arya Samaj of Ghana, The Sri Sathya sai Baba movement, The Akkanum Nama Shivaya Healing Church etc.

Prominent Ghanaian Hindus
 Swami Ghanananda, swami and founder of Hinduism in Ghana
 Victoria Lakshmi Hamah, politician

References

External links
African Hindu Council Mobilizes
Swami Ghanananda of Ghana

 
Sindhi diaspora